Craig Leonard is a Canadian politician, who was elected to the Legislative Assembly of New Brunswick in the 2010 provincial election. He represented the electoral district of Fredericton-Lincoln as a member of the Progressive Conservatives until the 2014 provincial election, when he was defeated by David Coon in the redistributed riding of Fredericton South.

References

Living people
Members of the Executive Council of New Brunswick
Politicians from Fredericton
Progressive Conservative Party of New Brunswick MLAs
Year of birth missing (living people)
21st-century Canadian politicians